Council of Dads may refer to:
The Council of Dads (book), 2010 book by Bruce Feiler

 Council of Dads (TV pilot), a 2011 TV series pilot based on the book and developed by Peter Tolan for Fox
 Council of Dads (TV series), a 2020 TV series based on the book on NBC

See also